The monthly magazine Sharafat (Persian: شرافت; DMG: Šarāfat; English: “honour“) was published in Teheran between 1896 and 1903. Under the management of Mohammad Bagher Khan, a minister of the cabinet of Mozaffar-ed-Din Shah, a total of 66 issues in one volume was published. Like Sharaf, as its successor, this magazine was also known for its numerous and elaborate illustrations and photographs. The magazine continued the tradition of Sharaf by focusing on publishing portraits and biographies of well-known Iranian and foreign notables, politicians and artists of that time, supplemented by numerous and elaborate illustrations and photographs. Sharafat changed and revolutionized the art and painting of that time.

References

External links
 Online-Version: Šarāfat
 Digital Collections: Arabische, persische und osmanisch-türkische Periodika

1896 establishments in Iran
1903 disestablishments in Iran
Defunct magazines published in Iran
Magazines established in 1896
Magazines disestablished in 1903
Magazines published in Tehran
Monthly magazines published in Iran
Persian-language magazines
Visual arts magazines